Mulchén Poco A Poco Airport,  was an airstrip serving Mulchén, in the Bío Bío Region of Chile.

Google Earth Historical Imagery (4/28/2007) shows a  grass airstrip within a commercial forest. The (9/4/2010) image shows the land planted with trees.

See also

Transport in Chile
List of airports in Chile

References

External links
OpenStreetMap - Poco A Poco Airport

Defunct airports
Airports in Biobío Region